Changqing District is one of 10 urban districts of the prefecture-level city of Jinan, the capital of Shandong Province, East China, covering part of the southwestern suburbs. It has an area of 1,208.54 km2 and has 578,740 permanent residents .

Administrative divisions
As 2012, this district is divided to 4 subdistricts, 5 towns and 1 township.
Subdistricts

Towns

Townships
Shuangquan Township

Climate

Historical sites
Lingyan Temple
Mount Liantai

See also

Changqing University City 
The Changqing University City(Chinsese:长清大学科技园) is located in Changqing, Jinan. It holds more than 10 universities and colleges, like Shandong Normal University, Shandong Women's University, etc.

References

External links
 Official home page

Changqing
Jinan